The 1930–31 Boston Bruins season was the Bruins' seventh season in the NHL. The Bruins repeated as division champions, but lost in the semi-finals of the playoffs.

Offseason

Regular season

Final standings

Record vs. opponents

Schedule and results

Playoffs
The Boston Bruins lost to the Montreal Canadiens in the Semi-Finals 3–2.

Player statistics

Regular season
Scoring

Goaltending

Playoffs
The Boston Bruins lost to the Montreal Canadiens 3–2 in the Semi-Finals.

Scoring

Goaltending

Awards and records

Transactions

See also
1930–31 NHL season

References

External links

Boston Bruins seasons
Boston
Boston
Boston Bruins
Boston Bruins
1930s in Boston